Dawn Elberta Wells (October 18, 1938 – December 30, 2020) was an American actress known for her role as Mary Ann Summers on the sitcom Gilligan's Island.

Early life 
Wells was born to Evelyn (née Steinbrenner) and Joe Wesley Wells in Reno, Nevada, where she attended Reno High School. Her father owned a local Reno construction company called "Wells Cargo" (not to be confused with the trailer manufacturer). After high school graduation, Wells attended Stephens College in Columbia, Missouri, where she majored in chemistry. She transferred to the University of Washington in Seattle, where she graduated in 1960 with a degree in theater arts and design. She was a member of the Alpha Chi Omega sorority.

Career 
In 1959, Wells was crowned Miss Nevada and represented her state in the Miss America 1960 pageant in Atlantic City, New Jersey.

In Hollywood, Wells made her debut on The Roaring 20's and the movie The New Interns and was cast in episodes of such television series as The Joey Bishop Show, 77 Sunset Strip with Efrem Zimbalist Jr., Cheyenne with Clint Walker, Maverick with Jack Kelly, and Bonanza with Lorne Greene and Dan Blocker.

Wells appeared as a guest star on the Wagon Train episode "The Captain Dan Brady Story" with guest star Joseph Cotten, Tales of Wells Fargo with Dale Robertson, 87th Precinct with Robert Lansing, Surfside 6 with Troy Donahue and Van Williams, Hawaiian Eye with Robert Conrad, Ripcord with Ken Curtis, The Everglades with Ron Hayes, The Detectives with Robert Taylor, Lawman with John Russell, Bonanza, It's a Man's World with Glenn Corbett, Channing with Jason Evers, Laramie with Robert Fuller, Burke's Law with Gene Barry, The Invaders with Roy Thinnes, The Wild Wild West with Robert Conrad, The F.B.I. with Efrem Zimbalist Jr., Vega$ with Robert Urich, The Love Boat, Fantasy Island with Ricardo Montalbán, Matt Houston with Lee Horsley, ALF, Herman's Head with William Ragsdale, Three Sisters with Vicki Lewis, Pastor Greg with Greg Robbins, and Roseanne with Roseanne Barr.

Gilligan's Island 

She took her signature role of Mary Ann on Gilligan's Island in 1964. She reprised her character in the various Gilligan's Island specials, including the reunion cartoon spin-off Gilligan's Planet and three reunion TV-movies: Rescue from Gilligan's Island, The Castaways on Gilligan's Island, and The Harlem Globetrotters on Gilligan's Island. She also reprised her character in a 1992 episode of Baywatch, "Now Sit Right Back and You'll Hear a Tale".

In 1993, Wells published Mary Ann's Gilligan's Island Cookbook with co-writers Ken Beck and Jim Clark, including a foreword by Bob Denver. Alan Hale Jr., who played The Skipper on Gilligan's Island, contributed a family recipe (Kansas Chicken and Dumplings) to her cookbook. Hale's character was the inspiration behind recipes such as Skipper's Coconut Cream Pie, Skipper's Navy Bean Soup, and Skipper's Goodbye Ribeye, and he is depicted as Skipper Jonas Grumby in numerous photographs throughout the book. She said in a 2014 interview with GoErie.com: "Alan could not have been kinder to a young actress. He was a real peach."

In 1997, Wells starred as her Gilligan's Island character in a music video for the song "Mary Ann" by the pop-punk band Squirtgun. The song describes an infatuation with Mary Ann and sings praises to the wholesome character, specifically choosing her over Ginger. The video reached the top 40 of MTV's Alternative Music charts, and it was featured as part of a variety of alternative-themed music video programs.

In 2005, Wells consigned for sale her original gingham blouse and shorts ensemble from her signature role. Auction house Profiles in History sold it for $20,700.

In 2014, Wells released What Would Mary Ann Do? A Guide to Life, which she co-wrote with Steve Stinson. The book was released to coincide with the 50th anniversary of Gilligan's Island.

A recurring theme, in the form of a rivalry, developed from the show that posed the question, mainly to men, as to which one of the female stars they preferred: Ginger or Mary Ann? Wells embraced the good-natured rivalry. During a 2014 interview with the Vancouver Sun, Wells said that she had a t-shirt that read: "Ginger or Mary Ann, the ultimate dilemma." The question of which of these two characters men prefer endured long after the end of the series. "You can go anywhere and say 'Ginger or Mary Ann?' You don't have to say what show it is. Everybody gets it. And I always win."

Film 
Wells had small roles in the early-1960s films Palm Springs Weekend and The New Interns, and later starred with Michael Dante in the independent 1975 film Winterhawk, playing a Western settler kidnapped by a Native American chief. Her other films include The Town That Dreaded Sundown, Return to Boggy Creek, Lover's Knot, Soulmates, Forever for Now, and Super Sucker. In fall 2011, she began filming Silent but Deadly (originally titled Hotel Arthritis), a comedy horror film released in 2012.

Theater 
Following Gilligan's Island, Wells embarked on a theater career, appearing in nearly 100 theatrical productions as of July 2009. She spent the majority of the 1970s and 1980s touring in theater productions, notably the second national (bus and truck) tour of Neil Simon's Chapter Two (in the role of Jennie Malone), and replacing Lorna Luft as Sonia Walsk in the second national tour of They're Playing Our Song. She also had a one-woman show at the MGM Grand Hotel and Casino in Las Vegas in 1985.

MeTV 
In May 2016, Wells was named marketing ambassador to MeTV Network, which had begun airing reruns of Gilligan's Island.

Humanitarian activities 
For several years, Wells operated a business, Wishing Wells Collections, making clothing for people with limited mobility. She was the founder of the Idaho Film and Television Institute, a not-for-profit, educational organization with "a vision of education, technical training and economic development in Southeastern Idaho.".

Wells organized and founded SpudFest, an annual family film and festival in Driggs, Idaho, which was sponsored by Idaho Potatoes.

SpudFest went from 2004 to 2008 and showcased many film premieres and included in-person festival appearances by classic TV icons including Barbara Eden of "I Dream of Jeannie" and Lou Ferrigno, who played the starring role on "The Incredible Hulk."

Actors Steve Martin and Danny Glover were both on the board of directors for SpudFest along with film producer Ted Weiant.

Wells lent her support to the Denver Foundation, a West Virginia charity chaired by Dreama Denver, widow of Wells' Gilligan's Island co-star Bob Denver. In November 2009, she appeared at the Denver Foundation's Christmas Wish Celebrity Auction, helping to raise funds for the disabled and disadvantaged in West Virginia.

Personal life and death 
Wells married Larry Rosen, a talent agent, on October 27, 1962. The couple had no children and divorced in 1967.

In 2018, a GoFundMe page was set up to help Wells cope with financial trouble from medical care after a fall.

In June 2020, Wells' manager revealed in court documents that Wells was suffering from dementia.

Wells died from COVID-19-related causes in Los Angeles on December 30, 2020, at age 82, during the COVID-19 pandemic in California. The week prior to her death, she had a Happy New Year video prerecorded to be released on the holiday.

Filmography 
Sources:

References

External links 

 
 
 
 
 
 
 

1938 births
2020 deaths
20th-century American actresses
21st-century American actresses
Actresses from Los Angeles
Actresses from Reno, Nevada
American film actresses
American musical theatre actresses
American stage actresses
American television actresses
Deaths from the COVID-19 pandemic in California
Miss America 1960s delegates
Miss Nevada winners
People from Teton County, Idaho
Reno High School alumni
Stephens College alumni
University of Washington School of Drama alumni